Edson Lobato is a Brazilian soil fertility scientist who received the 2006 World Food Prize for his role in helping transform the Cerrado into productive cropland. Adding to the contributions of fellow 2006 World Food Prize Laureates, Dr. A. Colin McClung of the United States, and Alysson Paolinelli of Brazil, Lobato helped make agricultural development possible in the Cerrado, a region named from Portuguese words meaning “closed, inaccessible land.”

References

Year of birth missing (living people)
Living people
Brazilian scientists
Agriculture and food award winners